The Cardinal is a 1901 historical play by the British writer Louis N. Parker. It is set in Renaissance Italy at the height of the power of the Medici Dynasty.

It originally premiered at the Theatre Royal, Montreal before transferring to the Garden Theatre on Broadway. It then enjoyed a run of 106 performances at St James' Theatre in London's West End between 31 August and 5 December 1903. The original London cast included E.S. Willard, Frederick Volpe, Harry Lonsdale, Alice Lonnon, Joseph Farjeon and Helen Ferrers.

Film adaptations

In 1936 the play was adapted into a film of the same title directed by Sinclair Hill and starring Matheson Lang, Eric Portman and June Duprez. It also inspired the 1945 Italian film L'abito nero da sposa directed by Luigi Zampa and starring Fosco Giachetti and Jacqueline Laurent.

References

Bibliography
 Curti, Roberto . Riccardo Freda: The Life and Works of a Born Filmmaker. McFarland, 2017.
 Goble, Alan. The Complete Index to Literary Sources in Film. Walter de Gruyter, 1999.
 Wearing, J.P. The London Stage 1900-1909: A Calendar of Productions, Performers, and Personnel. Scarecrow Press, 2013.

1901 plays
West End plays
Plays by Louis N. Parker
Plays set in Rome
Plays set in the 16th century
British plays adapted into films